Girish Chandra (born 15 January 1964) is an Indian politician who has been a Member of Lok Sabha for Nagina since 2019.

Political career
In March 2019, Mahagathbandhan, the grand alliance of Samajwadi Party, Bahujan Samaj Party and Rashtriya Lok Dal announced that Chandra would contest the upcoming 2019 Indian general election from Nagina constituency on the symbol of Bahujan Samaj Party. On 23 May 2019, Chandra was elected to the Lok Sabha after defeating Yashwant Singh of Bharatiya Janata Party, his nearest rival by a margin of 1,66,832 votes. Chandra polled 5,68,378 votes.

 He is well known for his attendance in Lok Sabha. He has 93% attendance in parliament as opposed to the national average 84%.

References

Living people
Bahujan Samaj Party politicians
India MPs 2019–present
1964 births